Raja is a village located within the Mustvee Parish, Jõgeva County in Estonia.

References

 

Villages in Jõgeva County